"Summer '68" is a song by Pink Floyd on their 1970 album Atom Heart Mother.

Recording 
Written and sung by Richard
 Wright, "Summer '68" was recorded at Abbey Road Studios in July 1970. Its lyrics describe Wright's meeting with a groupie in 1968.

On 4 December 1968, an incomplete version of this song, titled "One Night Stand", was started at Abbey Road Studios. The band kept working on it until 16 December, and it was eventually scrapped by the band on 16 January 1969 after a session at Abbey Road.

Reception 
In a retrospective review for the Atom Heart Mother album, Irving Tan of Sputnik Music gave "Summer '68" a positive review, describing it as "the catchiest and most-accessible track on the album." Tan really enjoyed Wright's vocals, the "bombastic trumpet solo breaks", and believed the track had "a groovy chorus".

In another retrospective review for the Atom Heart Mother album, IGN described "Summer '68" as "a catchy, fast and happy pop tune written and sung by Richard Wright" that's "one of the few songs Wright has ever done for Pink Floyd and it's actually pretty fine."

Personnel 
 Richard Wright – lead vocals, piano, Hammond organ
 David Gilmour – acoustic guitar, classical guitar, backing vocals
 Roger Waters – bass guitar
 Nick Mason – drums, percussion

with:

 Abbey Road Session Pops Orchestra – brass

References 

Songs about nostalgia
Songs about groupies
Pink Floyd songs
1970 songs
Songs written by Richard Wright (musician)
Song recordings produced by David Gilmour
Song recordings produced by Roger Waters
Song recordings produced by Richard Wright (musician)
Song recordings produced by Nick Mason